Nguyễn Thị Hòa (born May 31, 1995, in Bắc Ninh), known professionally as Hòa Minzy, is a Vietnamese singer and actress. She was the champion of the reality television competition Star Academy Vietnam in its first season. Hòa Minzy is known to the audience as a young Vietnamese female singer who possesses a strong and inspirational voice.

Not only showing talent in the field of music, Hòa Minzy is also a TV star admired by audiences, because of her energetic performances, her clever and flexible improvisation ability through game shows and talk shows she attended. In addition, Hòa Minzy tried her best in various roles such as an actress or a host. As of 2020, she has a one-year-old son with long-term boyfriend. In 2022, it was announced that Hoà and her long-term boyfriend have broken up.

Life and career

Early life
Nguyễn Thị Hòa was born in Quế Võ, Bắc Ninh, Vietnam, on May 31, 1995. She is the fourth of five children in her family. Hòa has been interested in singing since her childhood. Determining to pursue her passion, in the 11th grade, Hòa asked her parents to go to Hanoi alone, earn her living and study music. She earned the first money to feed herself by singing in tea rooms, cafes and accepting models for many teen magazines. Since then, she used the stage name Hòa Minzy.

2014: Entering showbiz with the title of Champion
Joining the 2014 Star Academy Vietnam, Hòa Minzy made a strong impression on the judges and the audience about the ability to sing, dance and transform different styles. The song "Làng Quan Họ quê tôi" (Làng Quan Họ my hometown) was performed successfully by her in the final night. Excellent over many heavyweight opponents, Hòa Minzy won the championship, after three months of competition.
 
On June 18, 2014, Hòa Minzy was crowned Champion of the first season Star Academy Vietnam finale with an audience rating of 51.16%. In the moment of coronation, Hòa Minzy happily shared: "The winner is not the best, but the one who can do anything in response to everyone's feelings for him, all the time. Before I entered the Star Academy and until now, I am not a perfect person. But I realized my shortcomings to continue the music path." After the competition, she officially stepped into the path of professional art activities.

In November 2014, Hòa Minzy released the debut music video "Thư chưa gửi anh" (My letter has not been sent to him yet), the song that previously composer Nguyễn Hải Phong composed for her, this is the first new song he wrote after two years of stopping writing.  Hòa Minzy's debut single received positive feedback from the audience.

On December 25, 2014, Hòa Minzy released the Audio MV song "Gửi" (Sending him) with gentle melody, romance and many emotions.

2015: The first career hit: "Ăn gì đây" (What to eat)
In June 2015, Hòa Minzy recorded the song "Sẽ chiến thắng" (Will win) to support the Vietnamese team at the 2015 Southeast Asian Games.

July 2015, Hòa Minzy cooperated with Mr. T to release "Ăn gì đây" (What to eat) MV. This is a product that "stormed" the online community around mid-2015. Hòa Minzy's youthful and fun melody, natural and liberal singing style really made a strong impression on the young public. "Ăn gì đây" once reached the Favorite Song in August 2015 and became the focus of this show, the performance of Hòa Minzy & Mr. T has received many compliments from the professional council and guests of the program. Besides, "Ăn gì đây" (What to eat) also has a humanistic meaning, that is to express the spirit of promoting traditional dishes of the North – Central – South as well as the pride of Vietnamese cuisine Culture, advanced culture deeply imbued with national identity and traditions. Following the success of "Ăn gì đây", there were many other versions of this song, including the Thai International version.

On September 10, 2015, Hòa Minzy released the song "Mưa nhớ" (Rainy, missing you), marking the first time combining her and the young musician Tiên Cookie.

2016–2017: First time working as a film director, encroaching the cinema field
In April 2016, Hòa Minzy participated in the Your Face Sounds Familiar (fourth season). She is one of the contestants who are highly appreciated right from the beginning. Because of the impressive performances, she gradually captured the heart of the audience and won the Most Favorite Contestant (31.5%). Also in 2016, Hòa Minzy assumed the role of MC in some Yeah1TV and YanTV programs.

On May 31, 2016, on her birthday, Hòa Minzy released a short film and the song "Vì anh là của em" (Because you are mine). This is a short film, she works as a director, casting, actress, and scenic design... Although the product has a lot of mixed feedback, it is the results of the righteous work with her own money.

In November 2016, Hòa Minzy released the song and the MV "Sống không hối tiếc" (Living my life without regrets), with changes in both style and music. Through this song, Hòa Minzy want to send a message to the young people, this is also a part of her current living statement: "Every mistake can be erased by the positive attitude and desire. You only live once. Youth, It will pass very quickly if we don't know what our purpose and the meaning of life is."  At the same time, she officially joined the same company with her teacher – musician Huy Tuấn (Stars Park Entertainment).

Next, Hòa Minzy participated in the horror movie – comedy "Linh Duyên" (Spirit). Movie released on February 24, 2017. Although this is the first time to encroach on the movie industry, Hòa Minzy has proved her ability. Because, perhaps, not many people can recognize the difference in acting between her and the veteran actors in the film.

Opening the 2017 music career, Hòa Minzy released the song and MV "Tìm một nửa cô đơn" (Finding a lonely half) on White Valentine's Day on March 14, 2017, with gentle, profound lyrics and images are invested professionally.

In May 2017, Hòa Minzy appeared in the "Ăn gì đây" (What to eat) MV version of Thailand with the comedian & YouTuber of Golden Temple – Bie The Ska. This is an MV based version of "Ăn gì đây" – Hòa Minzy ft. Mr. T (released July 2015).

In July 2017, Hòa Minzy participated in Glee Vietnam film (Vietnamized based on Glee (TV series)) as Linh San (Santana Lopez). The first episode aired on August 18, 2017.

2017: Bolero Princess and Hibiscus Family
In October 2017, Hòa Minzy participated in the 2017 Just the Two of Us (Lyrical & Bolero version), she was getting more and more of the audience's love through sweet performances. After the show, the audience loved calling Hòa Minzy as "Bolero Princess".

At the end of November 2017, Hòa Minzy and Đức Phúc and Erik had an impressive performance on the MAMA Premiere stage in Vietnam. The mashup version entitled "Better together"  is widely shared by the audience and the online community with many compliments and pride. In particular, the "unimaginable" high notes Hòa Minzy performed in the performance really made Vietnamese fans proud and scored in the eyes of international friends. In addition, the trio of Hibiscus family members are also close friends, often helping each other in work and life.

2018–present: Breakthrough with "Rời bỏ" (Leaving) and many million views songs 
In January 2018, Hòa Minzy joined Đức Phúc in launching "Thế là Tết" (That is Tết) music video. During the press conference for the release of this MV, she announced: "I don't want to be laughed at by people! I want my songs to be on the chart this year, must be outstanding songs. If I don't reach my goal, I will stop, do not work art to find a new way for my self." That confirmed the determination and seriousness of Hòa Minzy's music, she did not want to continue being attached to the nickname "hot singer without hit" anymore.

April 2018, once again Hòa Minzy joined Đức Phúc but this time it was a soundtrack song entitled "Cứ yêu đi" (Just love!) (OST 100 days with you), this is a composition of young musician Hứa Kim Tuyền with gentle, easy-listening, easy-going lyrics.

On May 6, 2018, Hòa Minzy released the audio version and the MV of "Rời bỏ" (Leaving), a sad Ballad song of musician Vũ Huy Hoàng. The story in MV and the song received sympathy from the audience. This is the highest achievement product of Hòa Minzy up to that point. In 2018, "Rời bỏ" achieved many impressive achievements as part of the Top Trending Music Video Vietnam – Youtube Rewind 2018, won Most Favorite Pop/ Ballad Song at the Zing Music Awards. Young audiences and many other artists love to cover "Rời bỏ" (Leaving), not only in Vietnamese but also in English, Thailand, Korean...

On July 25, 2018, Hòa Minzy returned to herself in music with the song "Nàng tiên cá" (Mermaid), this EDM song is Children's music. Although mainly for the kids, Hòa Minzy showed herself to be the most crazy mermaid in the Solar System.

On October 30, 2018, Hòa Minzy released the product "Chấp nhận" (Accept), this is the composition of the young musician An Trịnh. The product was quickly received by the audience and achieved top 1 achievement trending YouTube Vietnam, the audio version also ranked high on the online music charts.

Only in January 2019, Hòa Minzy launched three Viral clip music products, combining with many artists such as Đức Phúc, Justatee, Trường Giang, Only C, Miss Tiểu Vy... These are: "Để khoảnh khắc mãi đong đầy" (Let the moment be full), "Hết mana" (Out of mana), "Tự tin là chính tôi" (I'm confident to be myself). All three products have reached million views after a short time of launch and create a positive effect on social networks .

Also in January, Hòa Minzy first took on the role of coaching at game show "Tuyệt đỉnh song ca nhí" (Awesome duets – kid version), accompanying her on the red team was comedian Huỳnh Lập. On the personal Facebook page, the singer shared: "I'm not a coach just for fun, but will affirm my expertise and try to help the children in my team by the best of my ability."

"Chỉ là tình cờ" (Just by chance) is Hòa Minzy's latest song, which was released on the evening of May 28 with a lyric video, after nearly half a year of healing. Hòa Minzy once shared about her health in a bad condition affecting her voice. Hòa confided that it was quite a difficult time for her when she was unable to successfully complete the recording so she did not dare to enter the studio. "Chỉ là tình cờ" (Just by chance) opening for the Hòa Minzy's music product series will be released in 2019, which is also a gift to her 24th year.

Scandal

Abusing of personal relationships to meet BTS

Accidentally appearing in a video from the Korean media-recording ceremony of the Soribada Best K-Music Awards, Hòa Minzy immediately faced opposition, fierce criticism. Then, she had to make the decision to lock up her personal page to avoid terrible pressure from media and social network.

The phrase Sasaeng fan, which refers to fans, invades private life, makes the idol uncomfortable, the boycott fan community has now been associated with Hòa Minzy. At the Soribada Best K-Music Awards ceremony held on August 30, 2018, Hòa Minzy – according to the female artist's own disclosure – borrowed an acquaintance with an employee card to enter the backstage area, which was only for artists and those who are in charge.

The female singer accidentally "accused" of taking advantage of the relationship to enter an area not intended for fans to satisfy the desire to see idols, specifically the boys of BTS. Soon after, Korean music group fans in Vietnam voiced criticism of Hòa Minzy to violate the artist's life. The act of impersonating behind-the-scenes staff and carrying cameras is like a fan who is ostracized by the Kpop fan community.

Among the noises, Hòa Minzy posted an apology clip to BTS and the BTS fan community. She also asked to withdraw from the group's fandom after criticism. Hòa Minzy also stated that she will officially withdraw from the band's fandom, never sharing BTS photos or information on social media.

Discography

Singles

As lead artist

As featured artist

Promotional singles

Filmography

Television

Short film

Movie

Drama

Variety shows on V Live

Awards and nominations

Notes

References

External links 

 

1995 births
Living people
Vietnamese idols
21st-century Vietnamese women singers
Vietnamese pop singers
Vietnamese film actresses
Vietnamese television actresses
People from Bắc Ninh province